A megamusical (also known as a "spectacle show", "blockbuster musical", or "extravaganza") is a large-scale musical produced for large commercial profit. Such musicals utilize spectacle and increased technology to "radicalize the imagistic potential of musical theatre." Early concepts of the megamusical came into existence in the 1970s, and the form was established and popularized in the 1980s by individuals such as Andrew Lloyd Webber and Cameron Mackintosh. Megamusical is analogous to the film industry term "blockbuster".

Notable megamusicals include Cats (1981), Les Misérables (1985), The Phantom of the Opera (1986), The Lion King (1997), Wicked (2003) and Hamilton (2015).

Characteristics 
Megamusicals are known for their grand scale. They tend to be set in the distant past and cover broad, universal issues (usually concerning social justice) that global audiences can relate to. Their plot is melodramatic, generally large in scope and lofty, but is not the focus of the show. Instead, a megamusical's priority is visual spectacle, with ample attention given to visual elements like extravagant set and costumes, complex and technologically advanced stagecraft, and large casts that allow for big ensemble numbers with elaborate choreography.

The scores for megamusicals are also grand, consisting of pop-influenced catchy songs, power ballads, lush harmonies and lavish orchestrations. Similar to operetta, this genre relies on the "continuous musicalization of dramatic action", and commonly feature a sung-through script in which the recitative is used to carry any dialogue in between musical numbers. As such, they are also referred to as "pop-operas".

Megamusicals have huge budgets and their non-artistic elements tend to be large as well. They are heavily publicized and the marketing for a megamusical is very intense and costly. Another key element of this form is its commercial appeal: whether or not the musical will be a hit at the box office. Generally, a megamusical is expected to be a massive financial success, but not necessarily a critical success.

A "big" Broadway musical is not necessarily a megamusical. One major difference between long-running Broadway productions such as A Chorus Line and Chicago, and successful megamusicals is that the latter are global franchises. While musicals had long been an American institution, they gained unprecedented global recognition and success with the advent of megamusicals in the 1980s. Megamusicals are intended to be mass-reproduced worldwide and the successful ones run for decades in international markets. Once his musicals became famous and were being licensed all over the world, composer Andrew Lloyd Webber vowed to keep a very tight grip on them and would get final say on all productions regardless of the production team. This led to a strict level of standardization across the global productions of megamusicals that did not exist in live theatre before. This genre of musical theatre has thus been referred to as "McTheatre", alluding not only to the "ruthless cloning" of franchise productions, but also that its size and global reach is similar to that of the fast food chain giant, McDonald's.

A musical need not contain all of these elements to be regarded as a megamusical. Many of these features were established by the influential megamusicals of the 1980s, but the genre has since evolved. As such, consideration has to be given to the musical itself as well as the context surrounding it.

History 
Theatre historians and scholars often consider the megamusical genre to be a descendant of 19th century French opera, specifically operetta, because of their similar emphasis on spectacle. The concept musicals of the 1960s and 1970s, which prioritised visual representation over linear storytelling, are also seen as a precursor to this genre.

The megamusical phenomenon began with the 1981 musical Cats, composed by Lloyd Webber and produced by Cameron Mackintosh. Theatre scholar Vagelis Siropoulos explained:

Musicologist Jessica Sternfeld points out that while Cats was the "first true megamusical", an early form of the genre was first introduced by Jesus Christ Superstar, another musical by Lloyd Webber with lyrics by Tim Rice. Premiering on Broadway in 1971, some of the characteristics found in Jesus Christ Superstar later became key elements of the 1980s megamusical: a completely sung-through score replacing dialogue, expansive and complicated sets, and a melodramatic and larger-than-life plot. Lloyd Webber's 1978 musical Evita also featured these elements, leading Siropoulos to regard it as another early prototype of the genre — "not yet a megamusical in its finished form, like Cats".

The first two major players in the megamusical era were Lloyd Webber and Mackintosh, but soon after, they were joined by major corporations like Disney Theatrical Group, Viacom, PolyGram, and MCA. Disney Theatrical Group came onto the New York theatre scene in the form of megamusicals during the renovation of Times Square. To this day, they are one of the biggest producers of megamusicals on Broadway.

21st century 
After the September 11 attacks, Broadway ticket sales suffered. Ticket sales eventually started stabilising, driven not by tourists but by the locals. According to musicologist Elizabeth Wollman, New Yorkers sought escapist entertainment in the months and years following the attacks, and megamusicals fit that bill for them. Just a couple of years later came the megamusical Wicked, which featured two female leads and had feminist undertones. Since then, other megamusicals such as Hamilton have incorporated elements of social change. Hamilton is a story about Alexander Hamilton and many other white men, but the cast deliberately featured mostly people of color in the lead roles and ensemble. There has been debate over whether or not Hamilton is a megamusical, but those who say that it is cite its commercial success, its design elements (though it features a simple set, it has grand lighting and stage automation) and the fact that it is completely sung-through.

Technology 
The megamusical's continual innovation of stage technology has transformed the live theatre experience. The advent of the genre itself was driven largely by major technological advances and globalisation, with one major turning point being the advancement of audio technology. While radio microphones had been used sparingly as early as the 1964 Broadway staging of Funny Girl, the original 1981 production of Cats was the first known instance where an entire cast was individually outfitted with radio microphones. This departure from shared ambient microphones transformed sound design as it meant that musicals no longer had to depend on the acoustics and architectural design of the theatrical venue, and enabled megamusicals to achieve cinematic levels of sound amplification and studio-quality audio in live theatre. This practice of individually radio miking each performer has since become the norm in live theatre. Special effects technology also plays an integral role in this genre and has allowed for complicated set changes to be fully automated. Production manager Richard Bullimore was at the forefront of realising these technical advances along with companies such as Delstar Engineering, Stage Technologies and Unusual Rigging.

Notable examples 
Below is a non-exhaustive list of notable megamusicals.

Image gallery

References

Citations

Print sources

 
 

 

Musical theatre